The 2001 Winnipeg Blue Bombers finished in 1st place in the East Division with a 14–4 record. They appeared in the Grey Cup but lost to the Calgary Stampeders.

Offseason

CFL Draft

Regular season

Season standings

Season schedule

Playoffs

East Final

Grey Cup

Awards and records
CFL's Most Outstanding Player Award – Khari Jones (QB)
CFL's Most Outstanding Canadian Award – Doug Brown (DT)
CFL's Most Outstanding Offensive Lineman Award – Dave Mudge (OT)
CFL's Most Outstanding Special Teams Award – Charles Roberts (RB)
CFL's Coach of the Year Award – Dave Ritchie

2001 CFL All-Stars
QB – Khari Jones, CFL All-Star
SB – Milt Stegall, CFL All-Star
OG – Brett MacNeil, CFL All-Star
OT – Dave Mudge, CFL All-Star
ST – Charles Roberts, CFL All-Star
DT – Doug Brown, CFL All-Star
DB – Juran Bolden, CFL All-Star
DB – Harold Nash, CFL All-Star

Eastern All-Star selections
QB – Khari Jones, CFL Eastern All-Star
SB – Milt Stegall, CFL Eastern All-Star
OG – Brett MacNeil, CFL Eastern All-Star
OT – Dave Mudge, CFL Eastern All-Star
ST – Charles Roberts, CFL Eastern All-Star
DT – Doug Brown, CFL Eastern All-Star
CB – Marvin Coleman, CFL Eastern All-Star
DB – Juran Bolden, CFL Eastern All-Star
DB – Harold Nash, CFL Eastern All-Star

References

Winnipeg Blue Bombers
Winnipeg Blue Bombers seasons
James S. Dixon Trophy championship seasons
Winnipeg Blue Bombers